Afrophyla is a monotypic moth genus in the family Geometridae described by Warren in 1895. Its only species, Afrophyla vethi, was first described by Snellen in 1886. It is found in eastern Africa.

It has one subspecies, Afrophyla vethi meloui Prout, 1930, which is found in Madagascar.

References

Oenochrominae
Geometridae genera
Monotypic moth genera